Ben Mahmoud (October 6, 1935 – June 2, 2009) was a contemporary American artist.

Life and work
Mahmoud was born and grew up in Charleston, West Virginia. He received his higher education at the Columbus (Ohio) Art School and Ohio University, graduating in 1960. For most of his professional career, he taught at Northern Illinois University in DeKalb, Illinois, where he also kept his art studio. He was an emeritus professor at Northern Illinois before his death.

Painting was his most successful medium, attracting critical acclaim and commercial success, but he also worked in other media, including print making, photography, and sculpture. In 1972 he established an affiliation with the Sonia Zaks Gallery in Chicago that would last thirty years. His work currently remains affiliated with the Patricia Rozvar galleries in Washington.

Mahmoud has exhibited his work at galleries and museums throughout the American Midwest, and also in Washington, Holland, and Germany. His work has been added to over 25 permanent, public collections, including the Art Institute of Chicago, and the Brooklyn Museum.
Mahmoud lived the last several years of his life in New Port Richey, Florida, where his fascination with the surrounding flora influenced a collection of sculptures he called The Florida Series.

References

External links
Obituary in the Chicago Tribune
Western Michigan University Exhibition Information

1935 births
2009 deaths
Northern Illinois University faculty
Painters from West Virginia
Artists from Charleston, West Virginia
People from New Port Richey, Florida
Photographers from West Virginia
Sculptors from West Virginia
20th-century American sculptors
20th-century American male artists
American male sculptors
20th-century American painters
American male painters